Ludwik is a Polish given name.

Notable people with the name include:
 Ludwik Czyżewski, Polish WWII general
 Ludwik Fleck (1896–1961), Polish medical doctor and biologist
 Ludwik Gintel (1899–1973), Polish-Israeli Olympic soccer player
 Ludwik Hirszfeld (1884–1954), Polish microbiologist
 Ludwik Krzywicki (1859–1941), Polish economist and sociologist
 Ludwik Lawiński (1887–1971), Polish film actor
 Ludwik Mlokosiewicz (1831–1909), Polish explorer, zoologist and botanist
 Ludwik Mycielski (1854–1926), Polish politician
 Ludwik Rajchman (1881–1965), Polish bacteriologist
 Ludwik Silberstein (1872–1948), Polish-American physicist that helped make special relativity and general relativity staples of university coursework
 Ludwik Starski (1903–1984), Polish lyricist and screenwriter
 Ludwik Waryński (1856–1889), Polish activist and theoretician of the socialist movement
 Ludwik Zamenhof (1859–1917), Polish medical doctor, writer, and inventor of Esperanto.

Other people include:
 Ignace Reiss (1899-1937), Soviet spy whose best-known cover name was "Ludwik."

Polish masculine given names